Margaret Brooks Church (1889–1976) was an American mycologist who specialized in Aspergillus and other fungi involved in food fermentation. She co-authored the first manual on Aspergillus with Charles Thom and worked with Thom on his treatise on Penicillium. She was the first westerner to study the ang-khak fermentation of rice using Monascus purpureus (see: Church, 1920), and studied other Asian soy fermentations involving the fungus known as Aspergillus oryzae. This research culminated in her writing a USDA bulletin entitled Soy and Related Fermentations in 1923. In 1928 she took on a role as the Head of Biology at Urbana University, Urbana, Ohio, before her retirement in 1939.

Selected works

Thom C & Church MB. (1926) The Aspergilli. Williams & Wilkins Co., Baltimore, 272 pp.

References

1889 births
1976 deaths
American mycologists